Gürpınar is a quarter of the town Şabanözü, Şabanözü District, Çankırı Province, Turkey. Its population is 657 (2021). Before the 2013 reorganisation, it was a town (belde).

References

Şabanözü